István Putz (born 1 August 1955) is a Hungarian sports shooter. He competed at the 1980 Summer Olympics and the 1992 Summer Olympics.

References

External links
 

1955 births
Living people
Hungarian male sport shooters
Olympic shooters of Hungary
Shooters at the 1980 Summer Olympics
Shooters at the 1992 Summer Olympics
People from Veszprém
Sportspeople from Veszprém County
20th-century Hungarian people